Alberto Giordani (19 April 1899 – 8 November 1927) was an Italian footballer who played as a midfielder. On 29 May 1927, he represented the Italy national football team on the occasion of a friendly match against Spain in a 2–0 home win.

References

1899 births
1927 deaths
Italian footballers
Italy international footballers
Association football midfielders
Bologna F.C. 1909 players